Blaenavon Low Level railway station was the northern terminus of the Monmouthshire Railway and Canal Company line from Pontypool to Blaenavon in Monmouthshire, Wales.

History 

The station opened as Blaenavon on 2 October 1854, along with the rest of the line from Blaenavon to Pontypool. Low Level was added to its name on 19 July 1950 The GWR "lower line", which ran along the valley floor to Blaenavon Low Level, closed on 30 April 1962, a year before the Beeching I report. A number of passenger lines in Monmouthshire were closed around this time due to falling passenger numbers.

Today 
Nothing visible remains of the station; the site has been used for housing.

References 

Disused railway stations in Torfaen
Former Great Western Railway stations
Railway stations in Great Britain opened in 1854
Railway stations in Great Britain closed in 1962
1854 establishments in Wales